The Red Cloud Agency was an Indian agency for the Oglala Lakota as well as the Northern Cheyenne and Arapaho, from 1871 to 1878.  It was located at three different sites in Wyoming Territory and Nebraska before being moved to South Dakota.  It was then renamed the Pine Ridge Reservation.

Red Cloud Agency No. 1 (1871-1873) 
As stipulated in the Fort Laramie Treaty (1868), the US government built Indian agencies for the various Lakota and other Plains tribes.  These were forerunners to the modern Indian reservations.  

In 1871, the Red Cloud Agency was established on the North Platte River near Fort Laramie. Two year later it was moved to an eastern corner of Nebraska, then two years later to South Dakota.

Red Cloud Agency No. 2 (1873-1877) 
In August 1873, the agency was moved to the northwestern corner of Nebraska, near the present town of Crawford. Constructed on a hill overlooking the White River, the agency buildings included a large warehouse, offices, home for the agent, blacksmith shop and stables for horses. A school house was later added. Two trading stores were also built adjacent to the agency.

On 8 February 1874, agency clerk Frank Appleton was killed by the Miniconjou 'Lone Horn of the North.' Fort Laramie General John E. Smith was called by Saville to deal with three hundred Sioux braves besieging the agency. Smith eventually established a small army post near the agency called Fort Robinson.  

The Red Cloud Agency was the center of much activity during the Great Sioux War of 1876-77.  In May 1877, Crazy Horse and allied leaders came with their people to the Red Cloud Agency for surrender.  Following the killing of Crazy Horse, the agency was moved further west. 

The site of Red Cloud Agency No. 2 is included in Fort Robinson and Red Cloud Agency, a United States National Historic Landmark.

Red Cloud Agency No. 3 (1877-1878) 
The agency was moved to the White River in October 1877, in present day, South-Central South Dakota.

Pine Ridge Agency 
In 1878, the Red Cloud Agency was relocated to southern South Dakota and renamed the Pine Ridge Indian Reservation.

Indian Agents
James Wham
Jared Daniels
Dr. John J. Saville - a physician from Sioux City Iowa, arrived as agent in the fall of 1873. During his administration, the army established a post nearby.  The first treaty negotiations for the Black Hills were held between the US government and the Lakota.  Accused of graft, Saville resigned as agent in late 1875, although a commission investigation had cleared him of wrongdoing.
Valentine McGillycuddy
James S. Hastings
Lieut. Charles A. Johnson
Dr. James Irwin

References

Further reading
 George E. Hyde, Red Cloud's Folk: A History of the Oglala Sioux Indians (Norman, OK: University of Oklahoma Press, 1937).
 James C. Olson, Red Cloud and the Sioux Problem, (Lincoln, NE: University of Nebraska Press, 1965).
 Catherine Price, The Oglala People, 1841-1879: A Political History, (Lincoln, NE: University of Nebraska Press, 1996).
 Roger T. Grange, Jr, Fort Robinson: Outpost on the Plains, Reprinted from Nebraska History, Volume 39, No.3, September 1958.
 Mari Sandoz, Crazy Horse: The Strange Man of the Oglalas, (Lincoln, NE: University of Nebraska Press, 1961).

Arapaho
Cheyenne tribe
Former American Indian reservations
Lakota
Native American history of Nebraska
Native American history of South Dakota
Plains tribes
Sioux Wars
Wyoming Territory